This article provides two lists:
A list of National Basketball Association players by total career playoff three-point field goals made.
A progressive list of three-point leaders showing how the record has increased through the years.

Playoff 3-point field goals made leaders

This is a list of National Basketball Association players by total career playoff three-point field goals made.

Statistics accurate as of the 2022 NBA playoffs.

Progressive list of playoff 3-point field goals made

This is a progressive list of 3-point scoring leaders showing how the record has increased through the years.

Statistics accurate as of the 2022 NBA playoffs.''

See also
Basketball statistics
NBA post-season records
List of National Basketball Association career 3-point scoring leaders

References

External links 
Basketball-Reference.com enumeration of NBA career playoff leaders in 3-point field goals made

National Basketball Association lists
National Basketball Association statistical leaders